The following are the results of the 1907 Finnish Athletics Championships. The games, known as Kalevan kisat in the Finnish language, were first held in 1907 in Tampere, Pirkanmaa, Finland.

Results

References 

Finnish Athletics Championships
Finnish Athletics Championships
Finnish Athletics Championships